Australia's universities are home to a variety of different student union groups, providing a range of political, commercial and other services to students. The sector has undergone substantial change in recent years, with a decline in participation, intervention by university administrations, and the end of compulsory membership arrangements.

Although names such as union, student association, representative council and guild are common, in practice they provide little insight into an organisation's role on campus. In addition, some organisations have chosen to rebrand using entirely new names, with the term "union" in particular considered to be the source of misunderstandings about their role. Students at Macquarie and Arc @ UNSW are examples of this trend. Where campus unions are being replaced with university-owned corporate entities, non-traditional names such as UWS Connect and UniCentre are becoming common.

History

Early student unions 

The history of student union in Australian universities broadly reflects the changing nature of the student body in the Australian tertiary system.  The earliest student body was a largely wealthy group.  Entry into the University system was only available to the privileged and wealthy.  The associations formed by this body reflected the social associations formed by this class of Australians: they were largely voluntary and focused on extending the social opportunities of their members.  In the late 19th and early 20th century, at each University these organisations developed closer links with one another, and eventually transformed into unified student associations.

The rise of radicalism 

By the 1930s, the Australian Labor Party  was proving to be politically attractive to small groups of University students.  These students formed Labour Clubs, dedicated to the ideas of the labour movement, and began to contest for leadership of student associations. The Labor Clubs were often opposed by independent conservative students, but often conservative students lacked the vast activist apparatus built up under the Labour Clubs.

In the 1950s, the composition of the student body changed radically.  The Menzies Government founded new technically oriented universities, like the University of New South Wales, and expanded the role of the technical tertiary colleges.  This was in response to a perceived lack of graduate labour in the Australian economy.  Increasingly, working class students were able to access University through teacher-training schemes, veterinary preference schemes, and other avenues.  Bonded in labour to a government authority, these students could exert some level of pressure against their future "employer" by joining a union and protecting the rights of newer graduates with little real life experience and new to the workforce.  A similar wave of increased tertiary funding in the 1970s under the Whitlam Government saw the foundation of mostly regional tertiary campuses.  The opening up of higher education to a broader social group coincided with a period of popular student unionism in the 1960s, '70s and '80s.

Voluntary student unionism 

A new National Union of Students was established to replace AUS, this time with a structure designed to make it harder for constituent organisations to disaffiliate.

The collapse of AUS coincided with a hardening of attitudes on the right of politics towards student unionism. State and federal Liberal parties began to consider policies to stop student organisations from using funding from compulsory universal membership on left-wing political activities.

VSU began to gain legislative traction in the 1990s, with variations on the idea being briefly implemented in Western Australia and Victoria. VSU was also the policy of the Howard government, in power federally from 1996. Although Labor reversed the state VSU initiatives, the federal government brought in VSU legislation using its new Senate majority in 2005. VSU came into full effect at the beginning of 2007.

It wasn't just VSU that caused the student organisations problems: disputed elections, financial mismanagement and interventionist university administrations also took their toll. In the 2000s, many student organisations found themselves being liquidated or restructured by universities, losing much of their independence in the process.

Union Structure 

Campus unions have traditionally been responsible for the provision of commercial services, such as food and retail outlets, and activity programs, such as those associated with orientation week. The advent of voluntary student unionism and the impact of a number of financial scandals at student organisations have prompted many universities to significantly alter the structure of campus service delivery. At a number of universities, campus unions are assuming responsibility for student council activities.

Often student councils represent the interests of students to universities and to government. Many provide additional services including legal advice and student media outlets. At many universities, student council services are provided by a single-structure campus union (see below).

Dual-structure 
Campus unions that operate as part of a dual structure are in which an organisationally separate student council is present. Even among dual-structure campuses, organisational structure differs markedly.

Single-structure 
Campus unions that operate as part of a single structure, are in which student council services are provided by a division or department of the union.

Postgraduate organisations 

At many universities, postgraduate students are represented by separate student organisations. Given the smaller numbers - and relative time-poverty - of postgrads, these organisations tend to be smaller and are significantly under-resourced when compared to general or undergraduate groups. At a national level, postgrads are represented by the Council of Australian Postgraduate Associations.

National organisations  
 National Union of Students
 National Association of Australian University Colleges
 Council of Australian Postgraduate Associations
 Council of International Students Australia
 Australian Student Environment Network

See also 
 Students' union
 National Union of Students of Australia
 List of universities in Australia
 Voluntary student unionism
 List of student newspapers in Australia

References

External links 
 National Union of Students website
Council of International Students Australia website
National Association of Australian University Colleges website